Yang Wei-fuu is a Taiwanese politician, who has been the Vice Minister of Economic Affairs of the Republic of China since January 2015.

Education
Yang earned his bachelor's degree in civil engineering from National Chung Hsing University and master's degree in the same field from Colorado State University in the United States.

Early careers
Yang was the Director  General of Water Resources Agency (WRA), Director of WRA Central Regional Water Resources Office, WRA Deputy Chief Engineer and WRA section chief.

References

Living people
1952 births
Political office-holders in the Republic of China on Taiwan